The 2012 Georgia State Panthers baseball team represented Georgia State University in the 2012 NCAA Division I baseball season.  The Panthers played their home games at the GSU Baseball Complex.

Personnel

2012 Roster

2012 Baseball - 2012 Roster

Coaching Staff

Schedule

! style="background:#0000FF;color:white;"| Regular Season
|- valign="top" 

|- align="center" bgcolor="#ffbbb"
| 1 || February 17 ||  || GSU Baseball Complex|| 5-7 || 0-1 || -
|- bgcolor="#ccffcc"
| 2 || February 17 || Western Illinois || GSU Baseball Complex || 7-0 || 1-1 || -
|- bgcolor="#ccffcc"
| 3 || February 18 || Western Illinois || GSU Baseball Complex || 11-9 || 2-1 || -
|- bgcolor="#ccffcc"
| 4 || February 19 || Western Illinois || GSU Baseball Complex || 9-4 || 3-1 || -
|- align="center" bgcolor="#ffbbb"
| 5 || February 22 ||   || Athens, GA || 1-4 || 3-2 || -
|- bgcolor="#ccffcc"
| 6 || February 24 ||  || GSU Baseball Complex || 8-5 || 4-2 || -
|- align="center" bgcolor="#ffbbb"
| 7 || February 25 || Austin Peay || GSU Baseball Complex || 3-5 || 4-3 || -
|- bgcolor="#ccffcc"
| 8 || February 26 || Austin Peay || GSU Baseball Complex || 9-7 || 5-3 || -
|- align="center" bgcolor="#ffbbb"
| 9 || February 29 ||   || Spartanburg, SC || 1-4 || 5-4 || -
|-

|- align="center" bgcolor="#ffbbb"
| 10 || March 2 ||  || DeLand, FL || 4-5 || 5-5 || -
|- bgcolor="#ccffcc"
| 11 || March 3 ||   || DeLand, FL || 4-3 || 6-5 || -
|- align="center" bgcolor="#ffbbb"
| 12 || March 4 ||   || DeLand, FL || 0-5 || 6-6 || -
|- bgcolor="#ccffcc"
| 13 || March 7 ||  || GSU Baseball Complex || 5-4 || 7-6 || -
|- align="center" bgcolor="#ffbbb"
| 14 || March 9 ||   || GSU Baseball Complex || 5-11 || 7-7 || -
|- align="center" bgcolor="#ffbbb"
| 15 || March 10 || Kennesaw State || Kennesaw, GA || 4-5 || 7-8 || -
|- align="center" bgcolor="#ffbbb"
| 16 || March 11 || Kennesaw State || Kennesaw, GA || 6-7 || 7-9 || -
|- align="center" bgcolor="#ffbbb"
| 17 || March 13 ||    || GSU Baseball Complex || 3-8 || 7-10 || -
|- align="center" bgcolor="#ffbbb"
| 18 || March 14 ||   || Macon, GA || 0-11 || 7-11 || -
|- bgcolor="#ccffcc"
| 19 || March 16 ||   || GSU Baseball Complex || 13-12 || 8-11 || 1-0
|- bgcolor="#ccffcc"
| 20 || March 17 || Northeastern  || GSU Baseball Complex || 9-8 || 9-11 || 2-0
|- align="center" bgcolor="#ffbbb"
| 21 || March 18 ||  Northeastern || GSU Baseball Complex || 4-13 || 9-12 || 2-1
|- align="center" bgcolor="#ffbbb"
| 22 || March 20 ||   || Montgomery, AL || 9-14 || 9-13 || 2-1
|- bgcolor="#ccffcc"
| 23 || March 23 ||   || GSU Baseball Complex || 9-8 || 10-13 || 3-1
|- bgcolor="#ccffcc"
| 24 || March 24 || James Madison || GSU Baseball Complex || 4-2 || 11-13 || 4-1
|- align="center" bgcolor="#ffbbb"
| 25 || March 25 ||  James Madison || GSU Baseball Complex || 13-15 || 11-14 || 4-2
|- bgcolor="#ccffcc"
| 26 || March 28 ||   || GSU Baseball Complex || 15-3 || 12-14 || 4-2
|- align="center" bgcolor="#ffbbb"
| 27 || March 30 ||   || Fairfax, VA || 3-6 || 12-15 || 4-3
|- bgcolor="#ccffcc"
| 28 || March 31 ||  George Mason || Fairfax, VA || 8-3 || 13-15 || 5-3
|-

|- align="center" bgcolor="#ffbbb"
| 29 || April 1 ||  George Mason || Fairfax, VA || 1-3 || 13-16 || 5-4
|- bgcolor="#ccffcc"
| 30 || April 4 ||  Alabama State || GSU Baseball Complex || 9-4 || 14-16 || 5-4
|- align="center" bgcolor="#ffbbb"
| 31 || April 6 ||   || Hempstead, NY || 3-4 || 14-17 || 5-5
|- align="center" bgcolor="#ffbbb"
| 32 || April 7 ||  Hofstra || Hempstead, NY || 2-6 || 14-18 || 5-6
|- align="center" bgcolor="#ffbbb"
| 33 || April 8 ||  Hofstra || Hempstead, NY || 3-5 || 14-19 || 5-7
|- align="center" bgcolor="#ffbbb"
| 34 || April 11 ||  Mercer || GSU Baseball Complex || 5-12 || 14-20 || 5-7
|- bgcolor="#ccffcc"
| 35 || April 13 ||   || GSU Baseball Complex || 7-6 || 15-20 || 6-7
|- bgcolor="#ccffcc"
| 36 || April 14 ||  William and Mary || GSU Baseball Complex || 1-0 || 16-20 || 7-7
|- align="center" bgcolor="#ffbbb"
| 37 || April 15 ||  William and Mary || GSU Baseball Complex || 5-6 || 16-21 || 7-8
|- align="center" bgcolor="#ffbbb"
| 38 || April 17 ||  Georgia Tech || Atlanta, GA || 4-8 || 16-22 || 7-8
|- bgcolor="#ccffcc"
| 39 || April 20 ||  || Towson, MD || 8-5 || 17-22 || 8-8
|- align="center" bgcolor="#ffbbb"
| 40 || April 21 || Towson || Towson, MD || 1-11 || 17-23 || 8-9
|- bgcolor="#ccffcc"
| 41 || April 22 ||  Towson || Towson, MD || 14-5 || 18-23 || 9-9
|- align="center" bgcolor="#ffbbb"
| 42 || April 27 ||   || GSU Baseball Complex|| 0-15 || 18-24 || 9-10
|- align="center" bgcolor="#ffbbb"
| 43 || April 28 ||  UNC Wilmington || GSU Baseball Complex || 3-7 || 18-25 || 9-11
|- bgcolor="#ccffcc"
| 44 || April 29 ||  UNC Wilmington || GSU Baseball Complex || 8-7 || 19-25 || 10-11
|-

|- align="center" bgcolor="#ffbbb"
| 45 || May 2 || USC Upstate || GSU Baseball Complex || 3-15 || 19-26 || 10-11
|- align="center" bgcolor="#ffbbb"
| 46 || May 4 || VCU || Richmond, VA || 3-4 || 19-27 || 10-12
|- bgcolor="#ccffcc"
| 47 || May 5 ||  VCU || Richmond, VA || 12-3 || 20-27 || 11-12
|- align="center" bgcolor="#ffbbb"
| 48 || May 6 ||  VCU || Richmond, VA || 4-6 || 20-28 || 11-13
|- bgcolor="#ccffcc"
| 49 || May 8 ||  || Asheville, NC || 13-8 || 21-28 || 11-13
|- bgcolor="#ffffff"
| 50 || May 9 ||  UNC Asheville || Asheville, NC || Cancelled || - || -
|- bgcolor="#ccffcc"
| 51 || May 11 ||   || GSU Baseball Complex || 4-3 || 22-28 || 12-13
|- align="center" bgcolor="#ffbbb"
| 52 || May 12 ||  Delaware || GSU Baseball Complex || 1-4 || 22-29 || 12-14
|- align="center" bgcolor="#ffbbb"
| 53 || May 13 ||  Delaware || GSU Baseball Complex || 6-11 || 22-30 || 12-15
|- align="center" bgcolor="#ffbbb"
| 54 || May 17 ||  Old Dominion || Norfolk, VA || 1-8 || 22-31 || 12-16
|- bgcolor="#ccffcc"
| 55 || May 18 ||  Old Dominion || Norfolk, VA || 8-6 || 23-31 || 13-16
|- bgcolor="#ccffcc"
| 56 || May 19 ||  Old Dominion || Norfolk, VA || 8-4 || 24-31 || 14-16
|-

|-
|

References

Georgia State
Georgia State Panthers baseball seasons